The Roloson Houses, also known as the Robert W. Roloson Houses, are a group of four adjacent row houses in the Douglas community area of Chicago, Illinois, United States. The houses were designed in 1894 by architect Frank Lloyd Wright (1867-1959) for client Robert W. Roloson (1848-1925). Construction was begun in 1894 and completed in early 1895.

They were listed on the National Register of Historic Places in 1977.  They were designated a Chicago Landmark on December 27, 1979.

References

 Storrer, William Allin. The Frank Lloyd Wright Companion. University Of Chicago Press, 2006,  (S.026)

Frank Lloyd Wright buildings
Houses completed in 1894
Houses on the National Register of Historic Places in Chicago
Chicago Landmarks
1894 establishments in Illinois